George William Coventry, 13th Earl of Coventry (born 5 October 1939) is an English peer.

Coventry is the son of Commander Cecil Dick Bluett Coventry, and was educated at Prince of Wales School, Nairobi. In 1965, he married Gillian Frances Randall, by whom he has one daughter:
 Lady Diana Elizabeth Sherwood Coventry (b. 1980)

In 2004, he succeeded his fourth cousin in the earldom. He lives in Hampton, London.

References

1939 births
Living people
Earls of Coventry
Alumni of Nairobi School